Fire is a studio album by Kevin Martin under his alias The Bug. It was released on Ninja Tune on 27 August 2021.

Critical reception

At Metacritic, which assigns a weighted average score out of 100 to reviews from mainstream critics, the album received an average score of 85, based on 9 reviews, indicating "universal acclaim".

Tom Morgan, in PopMatters, describes Fires "tone" as one of "pure, scorching heat", and observes that it treats of themes including climate change and sociopolitical tensions. Morgan argues that Fire is Martin's "finest" as The Bug.

In Le Devoir, giving the album four stars, Philippe Renaud notes that the elements of grime, dancehall, and electronic music in Fire "add fuel to the fire" of Martin's "indignation". JR Moores, in The Quietus, describes Fire as "like a direct sequel" to London Zoo (2008).

The Quietus subsequently voted Fire as number 1 in their 100 favourite albums of 2021.

Track listing

References

External links
 

2021 albums
Kevin Martin (British musician) albums
Ninja Tune albums